The Love Corridor (German: Der Liebeskorridor) is a 1921 German silent comedy film directed by Urban Gad and starring Adolphe Engers and Erika Glässner.

Cast
 Anton Edthofer as Graf Troll 
 Adolphe Engers as Wuttke 
 Erika Glässner
 Jenny Marba
 Hermann Picha
 Felix Stärk

References

Bibliography
 Grange, William. Cultural Chronicle of the Weimar Republic. Scarecrow Press, 2008.

External links

1921 films
Films of the Weimar Republic
German silent feature films
Films directed by Urban Gad
German black-and-white films
German comedy films
1921 comedy films
Terra Film films
Silent comedy films
1920s German films
1920s German-language films